Anti-Bullying Day (or Pink Shirt Day) is an annual event, held in Canada and other parts of the world, where people wear a pink-coloured shirt to stand against bullying.

The initiative was started in Canada, where it is held on the last Wednesday of February each year. In New Zealand, Anti-Bullying Day is celebrated in May.

History 
The original event was organized in 2007 by twelfth-grade students David Shepherd and Travis Price of Berwick, Nova Scotia, who bought and distributed 50 pink shirts after a ninth-grade student Chuck McNeill was bullied for wearing a pink polo shirt during the first day of school at Central Kings Rural High School in Cambridge, Nova Scotia. That year, Nova Scotia Premier Rodney MacDonald proclaimed the second Thursday of September (aligning with the start of each school year) as "Stand Up Against Bullying Day" in recognition of these events.

In 2008, then-Premier of British Columbia, Gordon Campbell proclaimed February 27 to be the provincial Anti-Bullying Day. In 2009, the Boys & Girls Clubs of Canada worked on pink t-shirts that say "Bullying Stops Here." and "Pink Shirt Day" for Anti-Bullying Day.

In May 2009, New Zealand celebrated its first Pink Shirt Day.

In 2012, the United Nations declared May 4 as U.N. Anti-Bullying Day. Similarly, UNESCO declared the first Thursday of November as the International Day against Violence and Bullying at School Including Cyberbullying.

Purpose 
Anti-Bullying Day was instituted to prevent further bullying. The United States Department of Justice showed that one out of four kids will be bullied during their adolescence. Most of the time it continues after the first incident; statistics show that 71 percent of students that are bullied, continue to be bullied, making it a problem with no end. According to the Yale School of Medicine, a study in 2010 discovered a connection between being bullied and suicide. The term to describe this is "bullycide", wherein someone who is bullied commits suicide as a result.

Activities

Anti-Bullying Day activities can take place at schools, workplaces, or any peer group location. They may include "abolishing bullying" rallies, information and networking booths to help the community in understanding the evils of bullying, and publicizing anti-discrimination organizations.  Examples include Blue Shirt World Day of Bullying Prevention, National Bullying awareness month, and Pink Shirt Day. Other features include handouts, resources, and information promoting the message of the "National Day of Action Against Bullying and Violence". Examples of other activities include races, conferences, video-creating competitions such as the "ScreenIt!" and the "Back me up" competitions, and community events, all used to spread awareness of bullying and violence, The initiative seeks to support the work of students, educators, community and business in their efforts to stop bullying, discrimination, homophobia and transphobia.

See also
Anti-bullying legislation
Anti-bullying week
Cyberbullying
International Day of Pink
International Stand Up to Bullying Day
Orange Shirt Day

References

External links
Pink Shirt Day — The aim of CKNW Kids' Fund's Pink Shirt Day is to raise awareness of bullying in schools, workplaces, homes and online. The organisation also looks to raise funds to support programmes and facilities to foster children's health self-esteem.
Pink T-Shirt Day Society
Stomp Out Bullying — Stomp Out Bullying is a non-profit organisation aimed to change the culture for all students both kids and teens with inclusion,. The organisation dedicated itself to eradicate bullying against all walk of life through education on racism, homophobia, LGBTQ and discrimination. The organisation provides help to those at risk of bullying and suicide though close peer mentoring, events and social media out reach programmes.
Bullying No Way
Erase Bullying — Erase aims to strengthen school communities through building safer environments through empowering key figures in the community such as parents, students and educators. The organisations aims to erase, cyber-bullying whilst encouraging mental health and well-being.
Pacer's National Bullying Prevention Center — PACER's National Bullying Prevention Center was founded in 2006. The aim of the organisation was to introduce social change by preventing childhood bullying ensuring the youth are safe and in connection with the necessary support within school and communities.

Public holidays in Canada
Anti-bullying campaigns
February observances
May observances
United Nations days
Winter events in Canada
Public holidays in New Zealand